The Cyclone Taylor Award is the award given each year to the most valuable player on the Vancouver Canucks (a National Hockey League team). It is named after Cyclone Taylor, a Canadian professional ice hockey forward who led the Vancouver Millionaires to the Stanley Cup in 1915. The award was dedicated to him prior to the 1979-80 Canuck season, the season after his death on June 9, 1979, although an award for the Canucks MVP has existed since the team's inauguration in 1970. Previously it was a Canucks MVP Award as selected by the fans while the other MVP award, the President's Trophy was selected by CP Air and later Canadian Airlines. However after the 1995–96 season, the Cyclone Taylor Trophy officially became the lone Canucks MVP award since the winners of each trophy was identical.

The most prolific winner of the Cyclone Taylor Trophy is Markus Naslund, who has been awarded five times (including four straight from 2001 to 2004), followed by Trevor Linden with four. The trophy's present holder is Bo Horvat (2021).

Winners

See also
Babe Pratt Trophy
Cyrus H. McLean Trophy
Fred J. Hume Award
Molson Cup
Pavel Bure Most Exciting Player Award

References

External links 
 Official Canucks Award Winner Archive on Canucks.com

Vancouver Canucks trophies and awards